The Church of the Little Flower is a Roman Catholic church in Coral Gables, Florida founded in 1926.  The church's domed 1951 building was constructed in Spanish Renaissance style,  in keeping with the Mediterranean Revival architecture for which Coral Gables is noted.

The church members have long been conspicuously upscale. For most of the 20th century, its members were predominantly Irish-American, political liberals who voted the Democratic ticket, but by the end of the century, the majority of members were Cuban-Americans, who are  known for being politically conservative and voting Republican. Both Floridian contenders for the 2016 Republican nomination for president, Jeb Bush and Marco Rubio, attend Little Flower with their families. The Rubios were married in the church.

History

The church was established in 1926 at the request of a small group of Catholics in the newly established town of Coral Gables.  Bishop Patrick J. Barry of St. Augustine – the diocese that included Coral Gables at that time – announced that the new parish would be named in honor of Saint Thérèse of Lisieux, known as "The Little Flower". Masses were celebrated in  St. Joseph's Academy, a boarding school established by the Sisters of St. Joseph in 1925,  until the temporary church was built in 1928.

Although the Sisters of Saint Joseph had intended to expand their new school, and even to add a junior college, the Great Depression left them so short of funds that they signed the deed to St. Joseph's Academy over to the parish in 1932, and withdrew from Coral Gables.  The St. Joseph's Academy building was renamed St. Theresa School and became a parochial school associated with the parish. Originally staffed by the Sisters of St. Joseph, the school has been operated by the Carmelite Sisters of the Most Sacred Heart of Los Angeles since 1991.

The first structure built was the parish center and auditorium, which had a seating capacity of 800. It was formally dedicated in January 1928 by Bishop Patrick J. Barry and functioned as the church until replaced by the present church was built in 1951.  In 1987, the 1928 building  was renovated and renamed Comber Hall in honor of Rev. Msgr. Thomas P. Comber, Little Flower's first pastor.  Also in 1987, the church office was moved from the rectory to the former convent of the Sisters of St. Joseph across the street from the church.

The present church was built in 1951. The stained glass windows were designed by William Haley. It was dedicated by Archbishop Joseph P. Hurley of St. Augustine. The 1951 sanctuary seats 900. Rev. Manuel (Many) Alvarez is the current pastor.

Cultural shifts

Like Coral Gables itself, the church was built by well-to-do Americans; for most of the 20th century, members were predominantly Irish-American, politically liberal, and supporters of the Democratic Party. Membership was perceived as a "gateway to social advancement." In 1990 a rift developed between the parish priest, Father Kenneth Whittaker, a former Lutheran who had converted to Catholicism, and parishioners who did not attend church regularly.  Father Whittaker enforced new rules, including expelling children from the parish's socially and academically prestigious school if their parents failed to attend Mass regularly and on time. The issue escalated, with angry parishioners picketing the church and Father Whittaker refusing to confirm or give First Communion to children whose parents were lax in attending Mass.

The composition of the congregation changed with the arrival of an enormous wave of Cubans who immigrated to Miami after Fidel Castro's 1959 rise to power in the Cuban Revolution.  More than half of the parish and more than half of the children in the school were Cuban-American in 2000. The church became known as a center of political conservatism, with many members active in the Republican Party.  The membership is "predominantly" Cuban and Cuban-American. Historian Darryl V. Caterine credits their arrival with sparking a "dramatic religious revitalization" of Catholicism in South Florida.

According to historian Caterine, the 1991 arrival of the Carmelite Sisters of the Most Sacred Heart of Los Angeles sparked an intense revival of both Cuban identity and Catholic commitment among the members. Members described the arrival of the Carmelites as a kind of "miracle" in which their community was "transformed" by a renewed spirituality.  In 1999 over 40,000 people came to the church to venerate the relics of St. Therese of Lisieux, part of a world tour of the relics to inspire spirituality at the millennium.

Notable parishioners

Jeanette and Marco Rubio were married at Little Flower in 1998. Jeb Bush and Marco Rubio, both candidates for the Presidency, attended Little Flower during the 2016 United States presidential election. Previously, Andy Gomez, a retired Professor of Cuban Studies at the University of Miami and a member of the parish council, called Little Flower "the only Catholic church that has two presidential candidates." Little Flower has also been the site of several funerals for prominent figures connected to the parish, such as Juan Gonzalez, Marta Permuy, and Marlene Kerdyk.

Church of the Little Flower Pastors
 Rev. Msgr. Thomas P. Comber (1926–1960)
 Rev. Msgr. Peter J. Reilly (1960–1978)
 Rev. Msgr. William F. McKeever (1978–1982)
 Rev. Msgr. John W. Glorie (1982–1989)
 Rev. Kenneth D. Whittaker (1989–1992)
 Rev. Msgr. Xavier Morrás (1992–2002)
 Rev. Arthur Dennison (2002–2011)
 Rev. Michael W. Davis (2011–2019)
 Rev. Manuel F. Alvarez (2019–present)

See also
 Coral Gables Congregational Church

Gallery

References

Sources

External links

 
 

 

Buildings and structures in Coral Gables, Florida
Roman Catholic Archdiocese of Miami
Roman Catholic churches in Florida
Churches in Miami-Dade County, Florida
Spanish Colonial Revival architecture in Florida
1926 establishments in Florida
Roman Catholic churches completed in 1951
20th-century Roman Catholic church buildings in the United States